The Kerambit railway station is a Malaysian train station stationed at and named after the town of Kerambit, Lipis District, Pahang.

Train services
 Ekspres Rakyat Timuran 26/27 Tumpat–JB Sentral
 Ekspres Makmur Kuala 34/35 Lipis–Gemas

References

KTM East Coast Line stations
Lipis District
Railway stations in Pahang